M*A*S*H (Mobile Army Surgical Hospital) is an American media franchise consisting of a series of novels, a film, several television series, plays, and other properties, and based on the semi-autobiographical fiction of Richard Hooker.

The franchise depicts a group of fictional characters who served at the fictional "4077th Mobile Army Surgical Hospital (M*A*S*H)" during the Korean War, loosely based on the historic 8055th MASH unit. Hawkeye Pierce is featured as the main character, played by Donald Sutherland in the 1970 film M*A*S*H and by Alan Alda on the television series also titled M*A*S*H. Later spin-offs involve characters who appeared in the series, but were set after the end of the war. Almost all versions of the series fit into the genre of black comedy or dramedy; the lead characters were doctors or nurses, and the practice of medicine was at the center of events. However, to relieve the pressures of duty in a field hospital close to the front and the attendant horrors of war, the staff engage in humorous hijinks, frivolity, and petty rivalries off-duty.

The franchise effectively ended with the conclusion of Trapper John, M.D. in September 1986. A large fanbase for the series continues to exist; the show has never been out of syndication worldwide, and 20th Century Fox has had notable success selling the film and seasons of the TV series on DVD.

Novels

Richard Hooker wrote MASH: A Novel About Three Army Doctors (1968), based on his experiences as a surgeon at the 8055th MASH in South Korea. He published several other novels based on that group. A total of 15 M*A*S*H novels were published between 1968 and 1977, some co-authored by William E. Butterworth.

Film

M*A*S*H is a 1970 feature film adaptation of the original novel. The film was directed by Robert Altman and starred Donald Sutherland as Hawkeye Pierce and Elliott Gould as Trapper John McIntyre. Although the title had no punctuation onscreen, i.e. "MASH", in posters for the movie and in the trailer, it was rendered as M*A*S*H.

Television

M*A*S*H, a TV adaptation of the film, ran from 1972 to 1983, more than three times as long as the war it chronicled. It starred Alan Alda as Hawkeye Pierce and Wayne Rogers as Trapper John McIntyre. After the third season, Rogers left the show and was replaced by Mike Farrell as B. J. Hunnicutt. That same year, Harry Morgan replaced McLean Stevenson. Morgan, a veteran character actor and former Universal contract player, portrayed Colonel Sherman T. Potter. This series is the most popular and best-known version of the franchise and was ranked #25 in TV Guide'''s "50 Greatest TV Shows of All Time". Its final episode in 1983 was the most-watched in television history.Trapper John, M.D. featured the character of Trapper John McIntyre, played by Pernell Roberts, twenty-eight years after the events of the M*A*S*H film and television series. It was the first spin-off to feature a character from the series in civilian life after the war. Legally, Trapper John, M.D. is a direct spin-off of the MASH film rather than the television series due to licensing issues. The pilot episode briefly shows a photograph of Rogers and Alda.AfterMASH was a successor to the original M*A*S*H television series, featuring Harry Morgan, Jamie Farr, and William Christopher after the war, as the same characters they played in the original television series. Gary Burghoff and Edward Winter also appeared as guests. The series was canceled after two seasons.W*A*L*T*E*R was the pilot for a television series that was not picked up. It would have featured Gary Burghoff reprising the role of Walter O'Reilly. The pilot was shown as a "CBS Special Presentation" on July 17, 1984.

Plays
In 1973, a play by Tim Kelly, based on the book, television show, and film, was published in both one-act and full versions. The play incorporates many of the characters but omits more of the dark comedy aspects. It is occasionally produced by community theater and high school theater companies.

Elsewhere
The cast from the M*A*S*H series appeared in advertising for IBM products, such as the PS/2 line that introduced the PS/2 connector for keyboards and mice.

Fox developed a M*A*S*H video game that was released for the Atari 2600, Atari 8-bit family and the TI-99/4A. Players alternate between controlling a helicopter picking up wounded soldiers from the front and a surgeon removing shrapnel from a soldier, similar to Microsurgeon. InfoWorld called M*A*S*H'' "the exception" among the TI 99/4A's generally poor game library.

List of film and TV characters

See also

 "Suicide Is Painless"
 List of M*A*S*H characters

References

External links
M*A*S*H  Location Historical Marker

 
Fictional hospitals
Korean War television series
20th Century Studios franchises
20th Television franchises
United States in the Korean War